Yar Kandi (also Romanized as Yār Kandī) is a village in Ijrud-e Bala Rural District, in the Central District of Ijrud County, Zanjan Province, Iran. At the 2006 census, its population was 35, in 7 families.

References 

Populated places in Ijrud County